The Thursday Creek Mob is an Australian television sitcom which first screened on the ABC in 1971.

Cast
 Serge Lazareff as Pvt Shorty MacGoohan
 John Derum as Corporal Ginger Wiseman
 Joe Hasham as Pvt Squizzy Taylor
 Max Phipps as Lt Wigg
 Red Moore as Major Colin Buckmaster
 Mark Hashfield as Sgt Major Thomas Proudfoot
 James Bowles as Pvt Dim Sims
 Peter Gwynne
 Tim Elliott

See also
 List of Australian television series

References

External links
 
 The Thursday Creek Mob at Classic Television Australia

1971 Australian television series debuts
1971 Australian television series endings
Australian television sitcoms
Australian Broadcasting Corporation original programming
Black-and-white Australian television shows
English-language television shows